Mordellistena pallida is a species of beetle in the genus Mordellistena of the family Mordellidae. It was described by Champion in 1896.

References

Beetles described in 1896
pallida